Cyptocephala antiguensis is a species of stink bug in the family Pentatomidae. It is found in the Caribbean Sea, Central America, North America, and South America.

References

Articles created by Qbugbot
Insects described in 1837
Pentatomini